The XV Army Corps was a corps of the Union Army during the American Civil War. It served in the Army of the Tennessee under Maj. Gens. Ulysses S. Grant and William T. Sherman. It was commanded by Sherman in the siege of Vicksburg and then by Maj. Gen. John A. Logan in Sherman's Atlanta Campaign. Brig. Gen. Peter J. Osterhaus commanded the corps in the March to the Sea, but Logan was back in command during Sherman's Carolina Campaign. When General Howard became head of the Freedman's Bureau, Logan became the commander of the Army of the Tennessee for the final march to Washington. William Hazen became the XV Corps final commander.

The XV Corps' badge was a shield with a cartridge box in the middle with the Corps motto "40 Rounds." The badge and motto originated from the Western XV Corps' rivalry with the eastern XII Corps. When the Western and Eastern soldiers finally met up near Chattanooga in late 1863, the XI and XII Corps soldiers bragged about their crescent and star-shaped corps badges. When asked what badge the XV Corps had (The XV Corps did not have one yet at the time), an Irish soldier of the XV Corps said, "Moon and stars is it?  Sure it was the light of both ye needed to find your way home from Chancellorsville!" (The XI Corps had been routed at that battle)  whereupon he slapped his cartridge box and said, "Corps badge?  This is the badge of the Fifteenth Corps; 40 rounds!" This saying eventually reached the ears of General Logan. He soon sent out the following circular to his men: 

An alternate retelling of the tale behind the unique corps-badge, as given by Sherman in his Memoirs:

The Fifteenth Corps is highlighted near the end of Chapter III of MacKinlay Kantor's Pulitzer Prize-winning novel "Andersonville" (1955).

See also
Army of the Tennessee

References

External links 
XV Corps history

15
1862 establishments in the United States
Military units and formations established in 1862
Military units and formations disestablished in 1865